Lukovskaya is a rural locality (a stanitsa) and the administrative center of Lukovskoye  Rural Settlement, Nekhayevsky District, Volgograd Oblast, Russia. The population was 533 as of 2010. There are 15 streets.

Geography 
Lukovskaya is located on the right bank of the Khopyor River, 29 km northeast of Nekhayevskaya (the district's administrative centre) by road. Ostryakovsky is the nearest rural locality.

References 

Rural localities in Nekhayevsky District